Statistics of Swiss Super League in the 1907–08 season.

East

Table

West

Table

Final

|colspan="3" style="background-color:#D0D0D0" align=center|31 May 1908

|}

FC Winterthur won the championship.

Sources 
 Switzerland 1907-08 at RSSSF

Seasons in Swiss football
Swiss Football League seasons
1907–08 in Swiss football
Swiss